Amar Mitra may refer to

 Amar Mitra Peddireddy, Indian politician
 Amar Mitra (writer), Bengali writer